Lene Bidstrup Nyboe (born 19 August 1966 in Copenhagen) is a Danish curler. She played for Denmark on 1992 and 2002 Winter Olympic games.

References

External links

Living people
1966 births
Sportspeople from Copenhagen
Danish female curlers
Olympic curlers of Denmark
Curlers at the 1992 Winter Olympics
Curlers at the 2002 Winter Olympics
21st-century Danish women